Monika Conjar Lovrić (born 21 April 1995,27 years ago) is a Croatian football forward currently playing for Osijek in the Prva HNLŽ, and the Croatia national team.

Personal life
She is married to Croatian footballer Kristijan Lovrić.

References

External links
 

1995 births
Living people
Footballers from Zagreb
Croatian women's footballers
Croatia women's international footballers
Women's association football forwards
Croatian expatriate women's footballers
Croatian expatriate sportspeople in Slovenia
Expatriate women's footballers in Slovenia
ŽNK Mura players
Croatian Women's First Football League players
ŽNK Osijek players
ŽNK Split players
ŽNK Agram players